Francilla Agar (born January 14, 1975) is a Dominican former swimmer, who specialized in sprint freestyle events. She is the sister of sprinter Steve Agar.
Agar competed for Dominica in the women's 50 m freestyle at the 2000 Summer Olympics in Sydney. She received a ticket from FINA, under a Universality program, in an entry time of 29.90. She challenged seven other swimmers in heat three, including Nigeria's top favorite Ngozi Monu and Aruba's 15-year-old teen Roshendra Vrolijk. She rounded out the field to last place in 32.22, more than two seconds below her entry standard. Agar failed to advance into the semifinals, as she placed sixty-eighth overall out of 74 swimmers in the prelims.

Agar, who has dual citizenship with Canada, is openly lesbian, and contrasts the openness for LGBT people in Canada, and Sydney, to her childhood home. She was first attracted to women in Dominica, but the conservative and island's small population (about 70,000) population made things tense for expressing her sexuality. "It's very hush, hush. You have to realize that everybody knows you in Dominica. I'm pretty well known back home. I actually choose sometimes not to go back home because it's kind of difficult."

References

1975 births
Living people
Dominica female swimmers
Olympic swimmers of Dominica
Swimmers at the 2000 Summer Olympics
Dominica female freestyle swimmers
People from Saint David Parish, Dominica 
Lesbian sportswomen
Dominica LGBT sportspeople
LGBT swimmers